Azerbaijan Airlines, also known as AZAL, is the flag carrier and largest airline of the country of Azerbaijan. Based in Baku, adjacent to Heydar Aliyev International Airport, the carrier operates to destinations across Asia, the CIS, Europe and the USA. Azerbaijan Airlines is a member of the International Air Transport Association. The airline was founded on 7 April 1992 as the first national airline established after the country gained its independence.

History
The first air squadron in Azerbaijan was formed on June 2, 1938. This date was declared the Azerbaijan Civil Aviation Day under the Decree of the President of the Republic of Azerbaijan in 2006. During the period from 1941 to 1945 Azerbaijan aviation worked under the motto “All for the Front".

In 1990, Azerbaijan announced that it was setting up its own airline, and that it would be independent of Aeroflot, the long-time provider of air services for the Soviet republics. Azerbaijan Airlines (AZAL) was officially established on 17 August 1992. Its first president was Vagif Sadykhly.

Formed from the regional branch of Aeroflot, Azerbaijan Airlines, also known as Azerbaijan Hava Yollari, soon spread its wings into the world outside the Soviet Union, which had been Aeroflot's exclusive domain. A scheduled Baku-Istanbul route was launched in January 1991 in partnership with Turkish Airlines, and the cargo enterprise Aviasharg was created in cooperation with the United Arab Emirates. AZAL inherited a huge fleet from Aeroflot, including more than 20 Soviet-made Tupolev airliners, some regional airliners and freighters, 90 light aircraft, and 50 helicopters. It was quick to lease a pair of Boeing 727s, however, that once belonged to Pan Am (and were built in 1968). AZAL had an extensive involvement with the Farhad Azim associated Aviation Leasing Group (ALG), a U.S.-based lessor of Boeing 727s. It had a transatlantic charter cargo joint venture with ALG's Buffalo Airways, which was also training AZAL aircrews to Western standards in Dallas, Texas.

In November 1994, AZAL began a route to Dubai, which, along with Istanbul, was a key source of Western goods. It was soon also flying to Tehran, Tel Aviv, Saint Petersburg, London, and China. Service to several regional destinations was suspended in mid-1998, due to low margins and the need to repair three Yak-40 aircraft. With the exception of a few major cities, service to neighboring CIS countries was suspended in January 1999, due to debt. These routes were generally unprofitable as well, and were facing new competition from trains. According to the Trend News Agency, domestic flights accounted for only about 16 percent of AZAL's traffic in 1998.

Azerbaijan's border dispute with Armenia over Nagorno-Karabakh had delayed financing for two new Boeing 757s from the U.S. Ex-Im Bank. The $66 million loan guarantee was the Ex-Im Bank's first transaction for Azerbaijan, according to Air Transport Intelligence. The financing also was guaranteed by the Azerbaijan government and the International Bank of Azerbaijan. The United Kingdom's Export Credits Guarantee Department guaranteed financing for Rolls-Royce engines, utilized by both Boeing 757s. The first of the 757s was delivered in the fall of 2000. The planes offered the carrier unprecedented range, comfort, and efficiency on long-haul international routes. They also helped project a modern image to the world. The second Boeing 757 to be delivered arrived in December laden with medical supplies due to a recent earthquake in Azerbaijan. In January 2001, AZAL used one of the planes to begin operating a Paris-Baku route in collaboration with Air France.

Azerbaijan, a predominantly Muslim country, experienced a reduction in air traffic following the 9/11 terrorist attacks on the United States. AZAL was able to remain profitable through 2001, however, and even make progress toward paying off its debt. The airline was soon shopping for more new aircraft as it retired its aging Soviet models. AZAL ordered its first Western-made helicopters in October 2002, purchasing six for EUR 52 million from Eurocopter. AZAL used helicopters to ferry personnel and equipment out to oil rigs in the Caspian Sea.

In July 2004, two of AZAL's airliners were impounded by Turkey over a 12-year-old debt owed by Azerbaijan's Agriculture Ministry to a Turkish company. In the same month, AZAL ordered new Ukrainian-made, 52-passenger Antonov An-140 turboprops to replenish its regional fleet, paying about $36 million for four planes.

On 22 July 2010, Boeing and Azerbaijan Airlines signed an agreement to substitute two Next-Generation 737 airplanes for one 767-300ER (extended range) and two 767 Freighters. Including this announcement, Azerbaijan Airlines had a total of eight Boeing airplanes on order: two 767-300ERs, two 767 Freighters, two Next-Generation 737s and two 787-8s. In September 2010, AZAL cancelled an order for the remaining two Next-Generation 737s.

On 23 and 24 December 2014, Azerbaijan Airlines took delivery of the two Boeing 787 Dreamliners it had on order. The airline also launched its Premium economy product along with the introduction of the 787.

On 12 November 2017, Boeing agreed to sell five 787-8 aircraft to Azerbaijan Airlines, valued at about $1.9 billion at list prices.

Destinations

Codeshare agreements
Azerbaijan Airlines codeshares with the following airlines:

 Air Arabia
 Air France
 airBaltic
 Austrian Airlines
 Belavia
 Etihad Airways
 Lufthansa
 Qatar Airways
 S7 Airlines
 SCAT Airlines
 Turkish Airlines
 Ukraine International Airlines

Fleet

Current fleet
, Azerbaijan Airlines fleet consists of the following aircraft:

Historical fleet

Azerbaijan Airlines used to operate a number of aircraft, its most common aircraft used to be the Tupolev Tu-154 until it was retired in 2013. All the aircraft Azerbaijan Airlines used to operate are listed below.

Accidents and incidents

 On 30 November 1995, at about 19:10 LT, a Boeing 707-323C, which was registered as 4K-401, was en route from Urumqi (URC), but encountered some problems with the left main landing gear. After a low pass over Baku's runway, the aircraft made a left turn in preparation for landing at the airport. Shortly afterwards, however, the plane struck light stanchions on a road bridge and crashed into a field, killing two crew members and injuring four other people.
 On 5 December 1995, Azerbaijan Airlines Flight 56 was on a return flight between Baku and Nakhchivan. The flight departed Baku at 15:28, arriving at Nakhchivan at 16:37 after an uneventful flight. The plane was refuelled and prepared for the flight back to Baku, and departed at 17:52. While climbing through a height of 60 meters after takeoff and at an airspeed of 317 km/h, the no. 1 engine failed. The co-pilot reacted by countering the left bank. The captain then assumed control of the airplane. Because the co-pilot had countered the left bank, the captain did not have the sensory information which could have alerted him that it was the left-hand engine that had failed. The airplane continued to climb through 140m, passing through a layer of smog, after which the captain ordered the right-hand engine to be shut down. The flight engineer noticed that the power on the operating engine was decreasing. He brought the throttle back to the original position, but the engine had already stopped. Eight seconds later, the flight engineer reported that both engines had failed. The airplane had reached an elevation of 197 m and the speed had decreased to 290 km/h. The captain then decided to carry out a forced landing. The plane was then maneuvered for a forced landing during which a sharp right turn was made to avoid an apartment block. In a 37-degree right bank with a 10 m/s (1960 feet/min) descent rate, the airplane crashed into a field in the southwestern outskirts Nakhchivan, 3,850 m from the runway, killing 2 crew members and 50 passengers; 30 were injured. Investigation revealed that, following the mechanical failure of the left-hand engine, the crew shut down the working right-hand engine. The Tu-134B flight deck ergonomics contributed in that the flight engineers' engine parameters are difficult to monitor in conditions of weak illumination. It was later concluded that the engine failed because it was operated for more than 30 hours with an unrepaired defect.
 On 15 May 1997, a number of Azerbaijani soldiers were returning to camp near Ganja after a small arms practice and had begun shooting at a road sign. At the same time a Yakovlev 40 4K-87504 was returning from a training flight and was above the area on its approach to Ganja Airport. A number of stray bullets struck the Yak-40 and hit an oxygen cylinder. A fire broke out and control was lost. The aircraft crashed 5160m short of the runway, 95m left of the extended centerline. All 6 crew members died.
 On 18 August 2000, a passenger hijacked Azerbaijan Airlines Flight 154, a Tupolev Tu-154, while the plane was on a domestic trip between Nakhchivan and Baku. The hijacker claimed to be armed with a hand grenade and a bottle of flammable liquid. He demanded that the aircraft, which was carrying 164 passengers, be flown to Istanbul, Turkey, where he wanted to visit a hospitalized Azeri political leader. The hijacker agreed to the pilot's recommendation to refuel in Tbilisi, Georgia. However, the hijacker was overpowered by two Ministry of National Security officials who were on the plane. The plane landed in Baku, and the hijacker was arrested. He did not have a grenade but reportedly carried two bottles – one containing kerosene and the other an unidentified liquid. The hijacker was identified as the chairman of the Nakhichevan branch of the opposition Musavat Party. A number of the hijacker's largely political demands, including postponing parliamentary elections until December, were printed in an opposition newspaper the following day. Several days after the hijacking, the editor-in-chief of this paper was arrested and charged with terrorism for having maintained contacts with the hijacker. Documents relating to the hijacking were reportedly in his apartment. The hijacker, however, claimed to have acted alone.
 On 23 December 2005, Azerbaijan Airlines Flight 217, an Antonov An-140, registered as 4K-AZ48 and en route to Aktau, plunged into the Caspian Sea about 20 miles north of Baku. All 18 passengers and five crew members died. The airline grounded its other remaining An-140 airplanes and postponed plans to purchase more of the type from Ukraine. Investigators discovered that three independent gyroscopes were not providing stabilised heading and attitude performance information to the crew early in the flight.
 On 12 August 2010, Azerbaijan Airlines Flight 75, an Airbus A319-111 registered as 4K-AZ04 and bearing the name "Guba", suffered a collapse of the undercarriage when the aircraft exited runway 05-23 following arrival at Atatürk International Airport in Istanbul. The aircraft was substantially damaged, but all 127 passengers and crew escaped unharmed.

See also
 Civil Aviation Museum of Azerbaijan
 List of airlines of Azerbaijan
 List of airports in Azerbaijan
 List of companies of Azerbaijan
 Transport in Azerbaijan

References

External links 

 

Airlines of Azerbaijan
Azerbaijani brands
Airlines established in 1992
Companies based in Baku
Association of European Airlines members
Azerbaijani companies established in 1992